Erramadu is a village in Krishna of the Indian state of Andhra Pradesh. It is located in Tiruvuru mandal.

References 

Villages in Krishna district